Patrick Stokes (born 1978) is an Australian philosopher, Associate Professor in Philosophy at Deakin University and a former Research Fellow in Philosophy at the University of Hertfordshire. 
He is a winner of Australasian Association of Philosophy Media Prize and is known for his research on Kierkegaard's philosophy.

Bibliography
 The Naked Self: Kierkegaard and Personal Identity, Oxford University Press, 2015
 Kierkegaard's Mirrors, Palgrave, 2010
 Narrative, Identity, and the Kierkegaardian Self, Edinburgh University Press, 2015 (co-editor with John Lippitt)
 Kierkegaard and Death, Indiana University Press, 2011 (co-editor with Adam Buben)

References

External links
Stokes' Personal Website
Patrick Stokes at Deakin University

Living people
21st-century Australian philosophers
Philosophers of psychology
Philosophers of religion
Continental philosophers
Academic staff of Deakin University
University of Melbourne alumni
Kierkegaard scholars
1978 births
Academics of the University of Hertfordshire